Jatar Deul also called tower temple (rekha-deul), is located in the numerous rivers criss-crossed by stone-free alluvial and bush landscape of the southern Sundarbans settlements in the Indian state of West Bengal. It belongs to a small sub-group of Bengal temples, the architectural suggestions from Odisha can be traced back. However, this type of brick temple we can see at Nebia Khera, Uttar Pradesh.

Geography

Location	
The Jatar-Deul stands isolated on a small hill in the surroundings of the locality Kanakan Dighi, about 5 km east of the small town of Raidighi in the Mathurapur II community development block in the Diamond Harbour subdivision of the district of South 24 Parganas in West Bengal; whether it is in the vicinity of the temple, formerly a village has given, or whether it is a regional pilgrimage center, is unclear.

Note: The map alongside presents some of the notable locations in the subdivision. All places marked in the map are linked in the larger full screen map.

History
On the client, and thus also on the emergence time of the temple, nothing is known. Some of the researchers – due to the vicinity of the discovered copper plate with an inscription from the 10th century. Century, not, however, refers to the temple, or a simultaneous emergence of time adopted; others date it much later, and put the construction into the 17th. or 18. Century. The Archaeological Department board at the temple site places establishment around 11th century. The discovery of Jatar Deul dates back to the middle of the nineteenth century, when land surveyors stumbled upon a towering brick structure in the midst of the Sundarban.

Consecration
There is neither a cult nor any other sculptural or inscriptional evidence available, it is also the consecration of the temple is unclear – some believe it was originally for a Buddhist structure; others see it as a building in honor of the Hindu God Shiva (Mahadev), whose colorful image, and other religious BRIC-a-brac today, the interior of the Cella (garbhagriha) to decorate.

Architecture	
The only one about 30 m high tower (rekha-deul) with an internal approximately 3.10 m × 3.10 m mass, increased lying, but windowless cella existing brick temple stands on a square base of about 9,30 × 9,30 m. Noteworthy are the rekha-deul usual steep proportions, the several cornices on the high ogival  portal and vertical gradations in the upper part somewhat alleviated by be. A dome-shaped curvature of the construction developed only in the last meters.

According to the List of Monuments of National Importance in West Bengal Jatar Deul is an ASI listed monument.

Fair
A fair is held and a horse race is organised on 2nd Baisakh (the second day of the Bengali Year and generally falls on mid April) every year near the temple. Although called a horse race most of the participants are mules. The racetrack covers a huge area through freshly harvested and uneven agricultural fields. The horses have no saddle or stirrup and the jockeys hold on the animal by means of a bicycle tube.

Photos of Rekha-Deul temples in West Bengal

References

External links

 Jatar-Deul – photos + Infos (English)
 Jatar-Deul-floor plan, photo + short info (ASI, English)
 Jatar-Deul – Satellite photo + Infos (English)
 Kankandighi und Jatar-Deul – Satellite photo

Shiva temples
 Hindu temples in West Bengal
Monuments of National Importance in West Bengal
Tourist attractions in South 24 Parganas district
 Hindu temples in South 24 Parganas district
11th-century Hindu temples